Bangladesh participated in the 1986 Asian Games which was held in Seoul, South Korea from 20 September to 5 October 1986.

Medalists

Boxing

 Mosharraf Hossain won bronze medal in boxing Light heavyweight (81 kg) event.

Football

Group D

 Bangladesh did not advance in next stage and ranked 14th.

Field hockey

Men

Group B

Classification 5th–8th

7th place match

 Bangladesh ranked 7th in the field hockey.

See also
 Bangladesh at the Asian Games
 Bangladesh at the Olympics

References

Nations at the 1986 Asian Games
1986
Asian Games